Seventeen Days is the third studio album by American rock band 3 Doors Down. It was released on February 8, 2005, five years to the day that the band released their debut album The Better Life. It topped the chart on the Billboard 200 soon after it was released. Bob Seger sings a duet with lead singer Brad Arnold on the song "Landing in London".

Track listing

The UK bonus edition features "Let Me Go (Acoustic Version)" as a bonus track.
The iTunes version features "Be Somebody (Acoustic Version)" as an album-only track, appearing after "Here by Me".

Additional notes
The album was delayed shortly in 2004 because 3 Doors Down was busy touring around with their previous album Away from the Sun.
The live version of "It's Not Me" was featured on the Another 700 Miles EP.
Many people believe the album was written by the band in seventeen days, hence the name of the album, but this is not true. The name was created because the band only had 17 days off from the end of their Away from the Sun tour and being back in the studio to work on their new album.
Seventeen Days was certified platinum just a month after its release.
"Behind Those Eyes" was used as one of two theme songs for the World Wrestling Entertainment (WWE) event WrestleMania 21 in 2005.
This is the only 3 Doors Down studio album to feature drummer Daniel Adair, who left the group to join Nickelback in 2005.

Personnel
3 Doors Down
 Brad Arnold – lead vocals
 Matt Roberts – lead guitar, backing vocals
 Chris Henderson – rhythm guitar, backing vocals
 Todd Harrell – bass
 Daniel Adair – drums, backing vocals

Additional musicians
 Bob Seger – vocals on "Landing in London"
 Bekka Bramlett, Crystal Taliefero, Janet Kenyon, Amy Owsley and Kelley Norris – background vocals on "Father's Son"
 Nick Hoffman – banjo and violin on "Father's Son"
 Kristin Wilkinson, Anthony La Marchina, Mary Kathryn Van Osdale, David B. Angell (The Love Sponge String Quartet) – strings on "Here by Me" and "Landing in London"
 Kirk Kelsey and Kristin Wilkinson – string arrangements on "Here by Me" and "Landing in London"

Production
 Johnny K – producer, engineering
 Kirk Kelsey and Tadpole – additional engineering, digital editing
 Leslie Richter and Todd Schall – assistant engineering
 Andy Wallace – mixing at Emerald Studios, Nashville, TN
 John O'Mahony – Pro-Tools (assisted by Allen Ditto)
 Howie Weinberg – mastering at MasterDisk Studios, New York, NY
 Sandy Brummels – art direction
 Karen Walker – design
 Dean Karr – photography

Charts

Weekly charts

Year-end charts

Certifications

References

2005 albums
3 Doors Down albums
Universal Records albums